Ephesians Alexander Bartley Jr. (born August 9, 1969) is a former American football linebacker who played one season with the Philadelphia Eagles of the National Football League (NFL). He was drafted by the Eagles in the ninth round of the 1992 NFL Draft. He played college football at the University of Florida and attended Duncan U. Fletcher High School in Neptune Beach, Florida. Bartley was also a member of the San Antonio Texans of the Canadian Football League. He earned first-team All-SEC honors in 1991.

References

External links
Just Sports Stats
College stats

Living people
1969 births
Players of American football from Jacksonville, Florida
American football linebackers
Canadian football linebackers
Florida Gators football players
Philadelphia Eagles players
San Antonio Texans players
Duncan U. Fletcher High School alumni